No. 294 Squadron was a Royal Air Force air search and rescue (ASR) squadron active under RAF Middle East Command. During the second world war the unit operated rescue missions for Allied aircraft and aircrew over the eastern Mediterranean and later the Persian Gulf and Arabian sea.

History
No. 294 Squadron was formed at Berka, near Benghazi, Libya on 24 September 1943 from a former air-sea rescue flight. Equipped with the Vickers Wellington and Supermarine Walrus in the ASR role. The squadron's aircraft were detached to various airfields around the eastern Mediterranean. In October 1943 the squadron moved to Landing Ground 91 (LG.91), but still provided detachments to other airfields. In March 1944 the squadron moved to Idku, still in Egypt, and re-equipped with the Wellington Mk.XI and later also the Wellington Mk.XIII and the Vickers Warwick. In June 1945 the squadron moved to RAF Basra, Iraq to provide rescue cover in the Persian Gulf and Arabian sea until it was disbanded on 8 April 1946.

Aircraft operated

Squadron bases

Commanding officers

See also
List of Royal Air Force aircraft squadrons
List of World War II North Africa Airfields

References

Notes

Bibliography

External links
 squadron histories for nos. 291-295 squadron
 squadron history on MOD site

Aircraft squadrons of the Royal Air Force in World War II
294 Squadron
Rescue aviation units and formations
Military units and formations established in 1943
Military units and formations in Mandatory Palestine in World War II